(fem. ) is a term used for ethno-racial classification to refer to a person of mixed European and Indigenous American ancestry. In certain regions such as Latin America, it may also refer to people who are culturally European even though their ancestors are not. The term was used as an ethno-racial exonym for mixed-race  that evolved during the Spanish Empire. Although, broadly speaking,  means someone of mixed European/Indigenous heritage, the term did not have a fixed meaning in the colonial period. It was a formal label for individuals in official documents, such as censuses, parish registers, Inquisition trials, and others. Priests and royal officials might have classified persons as mestizos, but individuals also used the term in self-identification.

The noun , derived from the adjective , is a term for racial mixing that did not come into usage until the twentieth century; it was not a colonial-era term. In the modern era, mestizaje is used by scholars such as Gloria Anzaldúa as a synonym for miscegenation, but with positive connotations.

In the modern era, particularly in Latin America,  has become more of a cultural term, with the term indio being reserved exclusively for people who have maintained a separate Indigenous ethnic and cultural identity, language, tribal affiliation, community engagement, etc. In late 19th- and early 20th-century Peru, for instance, mestizaje denoted those peoples with evidence of Euro-indigenous ethno-racial "descent" and accessusually monetary access, but not alwaysto secondary educational institutions. Similarly, well before the twentieth century, Euramerican "descent" did not necessarily denote Iberian American ancestry or solely Spanish American ancestry (distinct Portuguese administrative classification: mestiço), especially in Andean regions re-infrastructured by Euramerican "modernities" and buffeted by mining labor practices.

In some Latin American countries, such as Mexico, the concept of the Mestizo became central to the formation of a new independent identity that was neither wholly Spanish nor wholly Indigenous. The word  acquired another meaning in the 1930 census, being used by the government to refer to all Mexicans who did not speak Indigenous languages regardless of ancestry.

During the colonial era of Mexico, the category Mestizo was used rather flexibly to register births in local parishes and its use did not follow any strict genealogical pattern. With Mexican independence, in academic circles created by the "mestizaje" or "Cosmic Race" ideology, scholars asserted that Mestizos are the result of the mixing of all the races. After the Mexican Revolution the government, in its attempts to create an unified Mexican identity with no racial distinctions, adopted and actively promoted the "mestizaje" ideology.

Etymology
The Spanish word  is from Latin mixticius, meaning mixed. Its usage was documented as early as 1275, to refer to the offspring of an Egyptian/Afro Hamite and a Semite/Afro Asiatic. This term was first documented in English in 1582.

Cognates and related terms

The Portuguese cognate, historically referred to any mixture of Portuguese and local populations in the Portuguese colonies. In colonial Brazil, most of the non-enslaved population was initially , i.e. mixed Portuguese and Native Brazilian. There was no descent-based casta system, and children of upper-class Portuguese landlord males and enslaved females enjoyed privileges higher than those given to the lower classes, such as formal education. Such cases were not so common and the children of enslaved women tended not to be allowed to inherit property. This right of inheritance was generally given to children of free women, who tended to be legitimate offspring in cases of concubinage (this was a common practice in certain American Indian and African cultures). In the Portuguese-speaking world, the contemporary sense has been the closest to the historical usage from the Middle Ages. The term  can also refer to fully African or East Asian in their full definition (thus not brown).

In Brazil specifically, at least in modern times, all non-Indigenous people are considered to be a single ethnicity (. Lines between ethnic groups are historically fluid); since the earliest years of the Brazilian colony, the  group has been the most numerous among the free people. As explained above, the concept of  should not be confused with mestizo as used in either the Spanish-speaking world or the English-speaking one. (There are  among all major groups of the country: Indigenous, Asian, and African, and they likely constitute the majority in the three latter groups.)

In English-speaking Canada, Canadian Métis (capitalized), as a loanword from French, refers to persons of mixed French or European and Indigenous ancestry, who were part of a particular ethnic group. French-speaking Canadians, when using the word métis, are referring to Canadian Métis ethnicity, and all persons of mixed Indigenous and European ancestry. Many were involved in the fur trade with Canadian First Nations peoples (especially Cree and Anishinaabeg). Over generations, they developed a separate culture of hunters and trappers, and were concentrated in the Red River Valley and speak the Michif language.

In Saint Barthélemy, the term mestizo refers to people of mixed European (usually French) and East Asian ancestry. This reflects a different colonial era, when the French recruited East Asians as workers.

In the Philippines, the word mestizo usually refers to a Filipino with combined Indigenous and European ancestry. Occasionally it is used for a Filipino with apparent Chinese ancestry, who will also be referred to as 'chinito'. The latter was officially listed as a "mestizo de sangley" in birth records of the 19th century, with 'sangley' referring to the Hokkienese word for business, 'seng-li'.

Mestizo as a colonial-era category

In the Spanish colonial period, the Spanish developed a complex set of racial terms and ways to describe difference. Although this has been conceived of as a "system," and often called the sistema de castas or sociedad de castas, archival research shows that racial labels were not fixed throughout a person's life. Artwork created mainly in eighteenth-century Mexico, "casta paintings," show groupings of racial types in hierarchical order, which has influenced the way that modern scholars have conceived of social difference in Spanish America.

During the initial period of colonization of the Americas by the Spanish, there were three chief categories of ethnicities: Spaniard (español), American Indian (indio), and African (negro). Throughout the territories of the Spanish Empire in the Americas, ways of differentiating individuals in a racial hierarchy, often called in the modern era the sistema de castas or the sociedad de castas, developed where society was divided based on color, calidad (status), and other factors.

The main divisions were as follows:
 Español (fem. española), i.e. Spaniard – person of Spanish ancestry; a blanket term, subdivided into Peninsulares and Criollos
Peninsular – a person of Spanish descent born in Spain who later settled in the Americas;
 Criollo (fem. criolla) – a person of Spanish descent born in the Americas;
 Castizo (fem. castiza) – a person with primarily Spanish and some American Indian ancestry born into a mixed family.
 Mestizo (fem. mestiza) – a person of extended mixed Spanish and American Indian ancestry;
 Indio (fem. india) – a person of pure American Indian ancestry;
 Pardo (fem. parda) – a person of mixed Spanish, Amerindian and African ancestry; sometimes a polite term for a black person;
 Mulato (fem. mulata) – a person of mixed Spanish and African ancestry;
 Zambo – a person of mixed African and American Indian ancestry;
 Negro (fem. negra) – a person of African descent, primarily former enslaved Africans and their descendants.

In theory, and as depicted in some eighteenth-century Mexican casta paintings, the offspring of a castizo/a [mixed Spanish - Mestizo] and an Español/a could be considered Español/a, or "returned" to that status.

Racial labels in a set of eighteenth-century Mexican casta paintings by Miguel Cabrera:
De Español e India, nace Mestiza
De Español y Mestiza, nace Castiza
De Castizo y Española, nace Española
De Español y Negra, nace Mulata
De Español y Mulata, nace Morisca
De Español y Morisca, nace Albino
De Español y Albina, nace Torna atrás
De Español y Torna atrás, "Tente en el ayre"
De Negro y India, Chino Cambuja
De Chino Cambujo y India, Loba
De Lobo y India, Albarazado
De Albarazado y Mestiza, Barcino
De Indio y Barcina, Zambaiga
De Castizo y Mestiza, Chamizo
Indios Gentiles (Barbarian Meco Indians)

In the early colonial period, the children of Spaniards and American Indians were raised either in the Hispanic world, if the father recognized the offspring as his natural child; or the child was raised in the Indigenous world of the mother if he did not.  As early as 1533, Charles V mandated the high court (Audiencia) to take the children of Spanish men and Indigenous women from their mothers and educate them in the Spanish sphere. This mixed group born out of Christian wedlock increased in numbers, generally living in their mother's Indigenous communities.

Mestizos were the first group in the colonial era to be designated as a separate category from the Spanish (Españoles) and enslaved African blacks (Negros) and were included in the designation of "vagabonds" (vagabundos) in 1543 in Mexico. Although Mestizos were often classified as castas, they had a higher standing than any mixed-race person since they did not have to pay tribute, the men could be ordained as priests, and they could be licensed to carry weapons, in contrast to negros, mulattoes, and other castas. Unlike Blacks and mulattoes, Mestizos had no African ancestors. Intermarriage between Españoles and Mestizos resulted in offspring designated Castizos ("three-quarters white"), and the marriage of a castizo/a to an Español/a resulted in the restoration of Español/a status to the offspring. Don Alonso O’Crouley observed in Mexico (1774), "If the mixed-blood is the offspring of a Spaniard and an Indian, the stigma [of race mixture] disappears at the third step in descent because it is held as systematic that a Spaniard and an Indian produce a mestizo; a mestizo and a Spaniard, a castizo; and a castizo and a Spaniard, a Spaniard. The admixture of Indian blood should not indeed be regarded as a blemish, since the provisions of law give the Indian all that he could wish for, and Philip II granted to mestizos the privilege of becoming priests. On this consideration is based the common estimation of descent from a union of Indian and European or creole Spaniard."  O’Crouley states that the same process of restoration of racial purity does not occur over generations for European-African offspring marrying whites. “From the union of a Spaniard and a Negro the mixed-blood retains the stigma for generations without losing the original quality of a mulato."

The Spanish colonial regime divided groups into two basic legal categories, the Republic of Indians (República de Indios) and the Republic of Spaniards (República de Españoles) comprised the Spanish (Españoles) and all other non-Native peoples. Indians were free vassals of the crown, whose commoners paid tribute while Indigenous elites were considered nobles and tribute exempt, as were Mestizos. Indians were nominally protected by the crown, with non-Indians (Mestizos, blacks, and mulattoes) forbidden to live in Indigenous communities. Mestizos and Indians in Mexico habitually held each other in mutual antipathy. This was particularly the case with commoner American Indians against Mestizos, some of whom infiltrated their communities and became part of the ruling elite. Spanish authorities turned a blind eye to the Mestizos' presence, since they collected commoners' tribute for the crown and came to hold offices. They were useful intermediaries for the colonial state between the Republic of Spaniards and the Republic of Indians.

A person's legal racial classification in colonial Spanish America was closely tied to social status, wealth, culture, and language use. Wealthy people paid to change or obscure their actual ancestry. Many Indigenous people left their traditional villages and sought to be counted as Mestizos to avoid tribute payments to the Spanish. Many Indigenous people, and sometimes those with partial African descent, were classified as Mestizo if they spoke Spanish and lived as Mestizos.

When the First Mexican Republic was established in 1824, legal racial categories ceased to exist. The production of casta paintings in New Spain ceased at the same juncture, after almost a century as a genre.

Because the term had taken on a myriad of meanings, the designation "Mestizo" was actively removed from census counts in Mexico and is no longer in official nor governmental use.

Gallery

Spanish-speaking North America

Mexico

Around 50–90% of Mexicans can be classified as "mestizos", meaning in modern Mexican usage that they identify fully neither with any European heritage nor with an Indigenous ethnic group, but rather identify as having cultural traits incorporating both European and Indigenous elements. In Mexico, mestizo has become a blanket term that not only refers to mixed Mexicans but includes all Mexican citizens who do not speak Indigenous languages even Asian Mexicans and Afro-Mexicans.

Sometimes, particularly outside of Mexico, the word "mestizo" is used with the meaning of Mexican persons with mixed Indigenous and European blood. This usage does not conform to the Mexican social reality where a person of pure Indigenous ancestry would be considered mestizo either by rejecting his Indigenous culture or by not speaking an Indigenous language, and a person with none or very low Indigenous ancestry would be considered Indigenous either by speaking an Indigenous language or by identifying with a particular Indigenous cultural heritage. In the Yucatán Peninsula, the word mestizo has a different meaning to the one used in the rest of Mexico, being used to refer to the Maya-speaking populations living in traditional communities, because during the Caste War of Yucatán of the late 19th century those Maya who did not join the rebellion were classified as mestizos. In Chiapas, the term Ladino is used instead of Mestizo.

Due to the extensiveness of the modern definition of mestizo, various publications offer different estimations of this group, some try to use a biological, racial perspective and calculate the mestizo population in contemporary Mexico as being around a half and two-thirds of the population, while others use the culture-based definition, and estimate the percentage of mestizos as high as 90% of the Mexican population, several others mix-up both due lack of knowledge in regards to the modern definition and assert that mixed ethnicity Mexicans are as much as 93% of Mexico's population. Paradoxically to its wide definition, the word mestizo has long been dropped off popular Mexican vocabulary, with the word sometimes having pejorative connotations, which further complicates attempts to quantify mestizos via self-identification.

While for most of its history the concept of mestizo and mestizaje has been lauded by Mexico's intellectual circles, in recent times the concept has been a target of criticism, with its detractors claiming that it delegitimizes the importance of ethnicity in Mexico under the idea of "(racism) not existing here (in Mexico), as everybody is mestizo." Anthropologist Federico Navarrete concludes that reintroducing racial classification, and accepting itself as a multicultural country, as opposed to a monolithic mestizo country, would bring benefits to Mexican society as a whole.

Genetic studies
A 2012 study published by the Journal of Human Genetics found that the Y-chromosome (paternal) ancestry of the average Mexican mestizo was predominantly European (64.9%), followed by Native American (30.8%), and African (4.2%). The European ancestry was more prevalent in the north and west (66.7–95%) and Native American ancestry increased in the centre and south-east (37–50%), the African ancestry was low and relatively homogeneous (0–8.8%). The states that participated in this study were Aguascalientes, Chiapas, Chihuahua, Durango, Guerrero, Jalisco, Oaxaca, Sinaloa, Veracruz and Yucatán.

A study of 104 mestizos from Sonora, Yucatán, Guerrero, Zacatecas, Veracruz, and Guanajuato by Mexico's National Institute of Genomic Medicine, reported that mestizo Mexicans are 58.96% European, 31.05% Native American, and 10.03% African. Sonora shows the highest European contribution (70.63%) and Guerrero the lowest (51.98%) which also has the highest Native American contribution (37.17%). African contribution ranges from 2.8% in Sonora to 11.13% in Veracruz. 80% of the Mexican population was classed as mestizo (defined as "being racially mixed in some degree").

In May 2009, the same institution (Mexico's National Institute of Genomic Medicine) issued a report on a genomic study of 300 mestizos from those same states. The study found that the mestizo population of these Mexican states were on average 55% of Indigenous ancestry followed by 41.8% of European, 1.8% of African, and 1.2% of East Asian ancestry. The study also noted that whereas mestizo individuals from the southern state of Guerrero showed on average 66% of Indigenous ancestry, those from the northern state of Sonora displayed about 61.6% European ancestry. The study found that there was an increase in Indigenous ancestry as one traveled towards to the Southern states in Mexico, while the Indigenous ancestry declined as one traveled to the Northern states in the country, such as Sonora.

Central America 

The Ladino people are a mix of Mestizo or Hispanicized peoples in Latin America, principally in Central America. The demonym Ladino is a Spanish word that derives from Latino. Ladino is an exonym dating to the colonial era to refer to those Spanish-speakers who were not colonial elites (Peninsulares and Criollos), or Indigenous peoples.

Costa Rica

 most Costa Ricans are primarily of Spanish or mestizo ancestry with minorities of German, Italian, Jamaican, and Greek ancestry.

European migrants used Costa Rica to get across the isthmus of Central America as well to reach the U.S. West Coast (California) in the late 19th century and until the 1910s (before the Panama Canal opened). Other ethnic groups known to live in Costa Rica include Nicaraguan, Colombians, Venezuelans, Peruvian, Brazilians, Portuguese, Palestinians, Caribbeans, Turks, Armenians, and Georgians.

Many of the first Spanish colonists in Costa Rica may have been Jewish converts to Christianity who were expelled from Spain in 1492 and fled to colonial backwaters to avoid the Inquisition. The first sizable group of self-identified Jews immigrated from Poland, beginning in 1929. From the 1930s to the early 1950s, journalistic and official antisemitic campaigns fueled harassment of Jews; however, by the 1950s and 1960s, the immigrants won greater acceptance. Most of the 3,500 Costa Rican Jews today are not highly observant, but they remain largely endogamous.

Costa Rica has four small minority groups: Mulattos, Afro, Indigenous Costa Ricas, and Asians. About 8% of the population is of African descent or mulatto (mix of European and African) who are called Afro-Costa Ricans, English-speaking descendants of 19th century Afro-Jamaican immigrant workers.

By the late 20th century, allusions in textbooks and political discourse to "whiteness," or to Spain as the "mother country" of all Costa Ricans, were diminishing, replaced with a recognition of the multiplicity of peoples that make up the nation.

El Salvador

In Central America, intermarriage by European men with Indigenous women, typically of Lenca, Cacaopera and Pipil backgrounds in what is now El Salvador happened almost immediately after the arrival of the Spaniards led by Pedro de Alvarado. Other Indigenous groups in the country such as Maya Poqomam people, Maya Ch'orti' people, Alaguilac, Xinca people, Mixe and Mangue language people became culturally extinct due to the mestizo process or diseases brought by the Spaniards. Mestizo culture quickly became the most successful and dominant culture in El Salvador. The majority of Salvadorans in modern El Salvador identify themselves as 86.3% Mestizo roots.

Historical evidence and census supports the explanation of "strong sexual asymmetry", as a result of a strong bias favoring children born to European man and Indigenous women, and to the important Indigenous male mortality during the conquest. The genetics thus suggests the Native men were sharply reduced in numbers due to the war and disease. Large numbers of Spaniard men settled in the region and married or forced themselves with the local women. The Natives were forced to adopt Spanish names, language, and religion, and in this way, the Lencas and Pipil women and children were Hispanicized. This has made El Salvador one of the worlds most highly mixed race nations.

In 1932, ruthless dictator Maximiliano Hernández Martínez was responsible for La Matanza ("The Slaughter"), known as the 1932 Salvadoran peasant massacre in which the Indigenous people were murdered in an effort to wipe out the Indigenous people in El Salvador during the 1932 Salvadoran peasant uprising. Indigenous peoples, mostly of Lenca, Cacaopera, and Pipil descent are still present in El Salvador in several communities, conserving their languages, customs, and traditions.

There is a significant Arab population (of about 100,000), mostly from Palestine (especially from the area of Bethlehem), but also from Lebanon. Salvadorans of Palestinian descent numbered around 70,000 individuals, while Salvadorans of Lebanese descent is around 27,000. There is also a small community of Jews who came to El Salvador from France, Germany, Morocco, Tunisia, and Turkey. Many of these Arab groups naturally mixed and contributed into the modern Salvadoran Mestizo population.

Pardo is the term that was used in colonial El Salvador to describe a person of tri-racial or Indigenous, European, and African descent. El Salvador is the only country in Central America that does not have a significant African population due to many factors including El Salvador not having a Caribbean coast, and because of president Maximiliano Hernández Martínez, who passed racial laws to keep people of African descent and others out of El Salvador, though Salvadorans with African ancestry, called Pardos, were already present in El Salvador, the majority are tri-racial Pardo Salvadorans who largely cluster with the Mestizo population. They have been mixed into and were naturally bred out by the general Mestizo population, which is a combination of a Mestizo majority and the minority of Pardo people, both of whom are racially mixed populations. A total of only 10,000 enslaved Africans were brought to El Salvador over the span of 75 years, starting around 1548, about 25 years after El Salvador's colonization. The enslaved Africans that were brought to El Salvador during the colonial times, eventually came to mix and merged into the much larger and vaster Mestizo mixed European Spanish/Native Indigenous population creating Pardo or Afromestizos who cluster with Mestizo people, contributing into the modern day Mestizo population in El Salvador, thus, there remains no significant extremes of African physiognomy among Salvadorans like there is in the other countries of Central America.

Today, many Salvadorans identify themselves as being culturally part of the majority Salvadoran mestizo population, even if they are racially European (especially Mediterranean), as well as Indigenous people in El Salvador who do not speak Indigenous languages nor have an Indigenous culture, and tri-racial/pardo Salvadorans or Arab Salvadorans.

Guatemala

The Ladino population in Guatemala is officially recognized as a distinct ethnic group, and the Ministry of Education of Guatemala uses the following definition: 
"The Ladino population has been characterized as a heterogeneous population which expresses itself in the Spanish language as a maternal language, which possesses specific cultural traits of Hispanic origin mixed with Indigenous cultural elements, and dresses in a style commonly considered as western."

Spanish-speaking South America

Argentina and Uruguay

Initially colonial Argentina and Uruguay had a predominantly mestizo population like the rest of the Spanish colonies, but due to a flood of European migration in the 19th century and the repeated intermarriage with Europeans, the mestizo population became a so-called Castizo population. With more Europeans arriving in the early 20th century, the majority of these immigrants coming from Italy and Spain, the face of Argentina and Uruguay has overwhelmingly become European in culture and tradition. Because of this, the term Mestizo has fallen into disuse. Nevertheless, the cultural practice of the region is commonly centred on the figure of the Gaucho, which intrinsically mixes European and native traditions.

Argentine Northwest still has a predominantly mestizo population, especially in the provinces of Jujuy, Salta, Tucumán, Santiago del Estero, Catamarca and La Rioja.

Chile

In Chile, from the time the Spanish soldiers with Pedro de Valdivia entered northern Chile, a process of 'mestizaje' began where Spaniards began to intermarry and reproduce with the local bellicose Mapuche population of Indigenous Chileans to produce an overwhelmingly mestizo population during the first generation in all of the cities they founded. In Southern Chile, the Mapuche, were one of the only Indigenous tribes in the Americas that were in continuous conflict with the Spanish Empire and did not submit to a European power. But because Southern Chile was settled by German settlers in 1848, many mestizos include descendants of Mapuche and German settlers.

A public health book from the University of Chile states that 30% of the population is of only European origin; mestizos are estimated to amount to a total of 65%, while Indigenous peoples comprise the remaining 5%. A genetic study by the same university showed that the average Chilean's genes in the Mestizo segment are 60% European and 40% Indigenous American.

As Easter Island is a territory of Chile and the native settlers are Rapa Nui, descendants of intermarriages of European Chileans (mostly Spanish) and Rapa Nui are even considered by Chilean law as mestizos.

Colombia

Colombia whose land was named after explorer Christopher Columbus is the product of the interacting and mixing of the European conquistadors and colonist with the different Amerindian peoples of Colombia. With the arrival of Europeans came the arrival of the enslaved Africans, whose cultural element was mostly introduced into the coastal areas of Colombia. To this day, Afro-Colombians form a majority in several coastal regions of the country. 

Over time Colombia has become a primarily Mestizo country due to limited immigration from Europe in the 19th and 20th centuries, with the minorities being: the mulattoes and pardos, both mixed race groups of significant partial African ancestry who live primarily in coastal regions among other Afro-Colombians; and pockets of Amerindians living around the rural areas and the Amazonian Basin regions of the country.

An extraofficial estimate considers that the 49% of the Colombian population is mestizo or of mixed European and Amerindian ancestry. Approximately 37% is of mainly European ancestry, although with an average of 24% native, (predominantly Spanish, and a part of Italian, French, and German) and of Middle Eastern ancestry. 10.6% is of African ancestry, though those of at least some* partial African ancestry raise the percentage to well over half of the entire country's population. Amerindians comprise 3.4% of the population. 0.01% of the population are Roma. The 2005 census reported that the "non-ethnic population", consisting of Europeans and Mestizos (those of mixed European and Amerindian ancestry), constituted 86% of the national population.

Ecuador
During the colonial era, the majority of Ecuadorians were Amerindians and the minorities were the Spanish conquistadors, who came with Francisco Pizarro and Sebastián de Belalcázar. With the passage of time these Spanish conquerors and succeeding Spanish colonists sired offspring, largely nonconsensually, with the local Amerindian population, since Spanish immigration did not initially include many European females to the colonies. In a couple of generations a predominantly Mestizo population emerged in Ecuador with a drastically declining Amerindian population due to European diseases and wars.

Afro-Ecuadorians, (including zambos and mulattoes), are a significant minority in the country, and can be found mostly in the Esmeraldas Province and in the Valle del Chota of the Imbabura Province. They form a majority in both of those regions. There are also small communities of Afro-Ecuadorians living along the coastal areas outside of the Esmeraldas province. However, significant numbers of Afro-Ecuadorians can be found in the countries' largest cities of Guayaquil and Quito, where they have been migrating to from their ancestral regions in search of better opportunities.

Mestizos are the largest of all the ethnic groups, and comprise 70% of the current population. The next 30% of the population is comprised by four ethnic groups with about 7.5% each, the Montubio (a term for Mestizos from the inland countryside of coastal Ecuador - who are culturally distinct from Mestizos from the rest of the country), Afro-Ecuadorian, Amerindians, and Europeans.

Paraguay

During the reign of José Gaspar Rodríguez de Francia, the first consul of Paraguay from 1811 to 1840, he imposed a law that no Spaniard may intermarry with another Spaniard, and that they may only wed mestizos or Amerindians. This was introduced to eliminate any sense of racial superiority, and also to end the predominantly Spanish influence in Paraguay. De Francia himself was not a Mestizo (although his paternal grandfather was Afro-Brazilian), but feared that racial superiority would create class division which would threaten his absolute rule.

As a result of this, today 90% of Paraguay's population is mestizo, and the main language is the native Guaraní, spoken by 60% of the population as a first language, with Spanish spoken as a first language by 40% of the population, and fluently spoken by 75%, making Paraguay one of the most bilingual countries in the world. After the tremendous decline of male population as a result of the War of the Triple Alliance, European male worker émigrés mixed with the female Mestizo population to create a middle-class of largely Mestizo background.

Peru

According to Alberto Flores Galindo, "By the 1940 census, the last that utilized racial categories, Mestizos were grouped with white, and the two constituted more than 53% of the population. Mestizos likely outnumbered Indians and were the largest population group."

Venezuela

Mestizos are the majority in Venezuela, accounting for 51.6% of the country's population. According to D'Ambrosio 57.1% of Mestizos have mostly European characteristics, 28.5% have mostly African characteristics and 14.2% have mostly Amerindian characteristics.

In the non-Hispanic Americas

Belize

Brazil

In Brazil, the word  is used to describe individuals born from any mixture of different ethnicity, not specifying any relation to Amerindian or European descent whatsoever. The Mixed Ethnicty Day, or Mestico Day (Dia do Mestiço), on 27 June, is official event in States of Amazonas, Roraima e Paraíba and a holyday in two cities.

They include mostly those of non-white skin color. In the same way, a term used to describe anyone with any degree of miscegenation in one's blood line, may apply to all said groups (that in Portugal and its ex-colonies, always depended solely on phenotype, meaning a brown person may have a full sibling of all other basic phenotypes and thus ethnic groups).

They are an important group in the Northern (Amazon Basin) region, but also relatively numerous on the Northeastern and Center-Western ones.

There are, however, important groups who are  but not necessarily .

United States 

The United States has a large Mestizo population, as many Latino Americans of Mexican or Central American or South American descent are technically Mestizo. The term mestizo is not used for official purposes, with Mexican Americans being classed in roughly equal proportions as "white" or "some other ethnicity".

A 2015 report by the Pew Research Center showed that "When asked if they identify as “mestizo,” “mulatto” or some other mixed-race combination, one-third of U.S. Hispanics say they do". These were more likely to be U.S. born, non-Mexican, and have a  higher education attainment than those who do not so identify.

Mestizaje in Latin America

 is a term that came into usage in twentieth-century Latin America for racial mixing, not a colonial-era term. In the modern era, it is used to denote the positive unity of race mixtures in modern Latin America. This ideological stance is in contrast to the term miscegenation, which usually has negative connotations. The main ideological advocate of mestizaje was José Vasconcelos (1882–1959), the Mexican Minister of Education in the 1920s. The term was in circulation in Mexico in the late nineteenth century, along with similar terms, cruzamiento ("crossing") and mestización (process of "Mestizo-izing"). In Spanish America, the colonial-era system of castas sought to differentiate between individuals and groups on the basis of a hierarchical classification by ancestry, skin color, and status (calidad), giving separate labels to the perceived categorical differences and privileging whiteness. In contrast, the idea of modern mestizaje is the positive unity of a nation's citizenry based on racial mixture. "Mestizaje placed greater emphasis [than the casta system] on commonality and hybridity to engineer order and unity... [it] operated within the context of the nation-state and sought to derive meaning from Latin America's own internal experiences rather than the dictates and necessities of empire... ultimately [it] embraced racial mixture."

In post-revolution Mexico
At independence in Mexico, the casta classifications were abolished, but discrimination based on skin color and socioeconomic status continued. Liberal intellectuals grappled with the "Indian Problem", that is, the Amerindians' lack of cultural assimilation to Mexican national life as citizens of the nation, rather than members of their Indigenous communities. Urban elites spurned mixed-race urban plebeians and Amerindians along with their traditional popular culture. In the late nineteenth century during the rule of Porfirio Díaz, elites sought to be, act, and look like modern Europeans, that is, different from the majority of the Mexican population. Díaz was mixed-race himself, but powdered his dark skin to hide his Mixtec Indigenous ancestry. At the end of the nineteenth century, however, as social and economic tensions increased in Mexico, two major works by Mexican intellectuals sought to rehabilitate the assessment of the Mestizo. Díaz's Minister of Education, Justo Sierra published The Political Evolution of the Mexican People (1902), which situated Mexican identity in the mixing of European whites and Amerindians. Mexicans are "the sons of two peoples, of two races. [This fact] dominates our whole history; to this we owe our soul." Intellectual Andrés Molina Enríquez also took a revisionist stance on Mestizos in his work Los grandes problemas nacionales (The Great National Problems) (1909).

The Mexican state after the Mexican Revolution (1910–20) embraced the ideology of mestizaje as a nation-building tool, aimed at integrating Amerindians culturally and politically in the construction of national identity. As such it has meant a systematic effort to eliminate Indigenous culture, in the name of integrating them into a supposedly inclusive Mestizo identity. For Afro-Mexicans, the ideology has denied their historical contributions to Mexico and their current place in Mexican political life. Mexican politicians and reformers such as José Vasconcelos and Manuel Gamio were instrumental in building a Mexican national identity on the concept of "mestizaje" (the process of ethnic homogenization).

Cultural policies in early post-revolutionary Mexico were paternalistic towards the Indigenous people, with efforts designed to "help" Indigenous peoples achieve the same level of progress as the Mestizo society, eventually assimilating Indigenous peoples completely to mainstream Mexican culture, working toward the goal of eventually solving the "Indian problem" by transforming Indigenous communities into Mestizo communities.

In recent years, Mestizos' sole claim to Mexican national identity has begun to erode, at least rhetorically." A constitutional changes to Article 4 that now says that the "Mexican Nation has a pluricultural composition, originally based on its Indigenous peoples. The law will protect and promote the development of their languages, cultures, uses, customs, resources, and specific forms of social organization and will guarantee their members effective access to the jurisdiction of the State."

Elsewhere in Latin America
There has been considerable work on race and race mixture in various parts of Latin America in recent years. Including South America; Venezuela Brazil, Peru and Colombia.

Mestizos migrating to Europe

Martín Cortés, son of the Spanish conquistador Hernán Cortés and of the Nahuatl–Maya Indigenous Mexican interpreter Malinche, was one of the first documented mestizos to arrive in Spain. His first trip occurred in 1528, when he accompanied his father, Hernán Cortés, who sought to have him legitimized by Pope Clement VII, the Pope of Rome from 1523 to 1534.

There is also verified evidence of the grandchildren of Moctezuma II, Aztec emperor, whose royal descent the Spanish Crown acknowledged, willingly having set foot on European soil. Among these descendants are the Counts of Miravalle, and the Dukes of Moctezuma de Tultengo, who became part of the Spanish peerage and left many descendants in Europe. The Counts of Miravalle, residing in Andalucía, Spain, demanded in 2003 that the government of Mexico recommence payment of the so-called "Moctezuma pensions" it had cancelled in 1934.

The mestizo historian Inca Garcilaso de la Vega, son of Spanish conquistador Sebastián Garcilaso de la Vega and of the Inca princess Isabel Chimpo Oclloun arrived in Spain from Peru. He lived in the town of Montilla, Andalucía, where he died in 1616. The mestizo children of Francisco Pizarro were also military leaders because of their famous father. Starting in the early 19th and throughout the 1980s, France and Sweden saw the arrival of hundreds of Chileans, many of whom fled Chile during the dictatorial government of Augusto Pinochet.

Many mestizos born and/or living in Europe are children of intermarriages of Native Latin American and European spouses, Europeans are not limited to Spaniards and Portuguese.

See also

 Arab-Berber
 Brown (racial classification)
 Bronze (racial classification)
 Casta
 Castizo
European colonization of the Americas
Indigenous peoples of the Americas
Indo people
Melting pot 
Mestizo art
Mischling
Mixed-blood
Mulatto
Spanish colonization of the Americas

References

Further reading

Ades Queija, Berta. "Mestizos en hábito de indios: Estraegias transgresoras o identidades difusas?" Pasar as fronteiras: Actas do II Colóqyui Internacional sobre Mediadores Culturais, séculos XV a XVIII (Lagos-Outubro 1997). Ed. Rui Manuel Loureiro and Serge Gruzinski, 122-46. Lagos, Nigeria: Centro de Estudios Gil Eanes 1999.

Bonil Gómez, Katherine. Gobierno y calidad en el orden colonial: Las categorías del mestizaje en la provincia de Mariquita en la segunda mitad del siglo XVIII. Bogotá: Ediciones Uniandes 2011.
Chance, John K. Race and Class in Colonial Oaxaca. Stanford: Stanford University Press 1978.
Cope, R. Douglas. The Limits of Racial Domination: Plebeian Society in Col-515.onial Mexico City, 1660-1720. Madison: University of Wisconsin Press 1994.

de la Cadena, Marisol. Indigenous Mestizos: The Politics of Race and Culture in Cuzco, Peru 1919-1991. Durham: Duke University Press 2000.

Fisher, Andrew B. and Matthew O'Hara, eds. Imperial Subjects: Race and Identity in Colonial Latin America. Durham: Duke University Press 2009.
Frederick, Jake. "Without Impediment: Crossing Racial Boundaries in Colonial Mexico." The Americas 67. 4 (2011): 495-515.
 
Gruzinski, Serge. The Mestizo Mind: The Intellectual Dynamics of Colonization and Globalization. Trans. Deke Dusinberre. Longon: Routledge 2002. 
Hill, ruth. "Casta as Culture and the Sociedad de Castas as Literature." Interpreting Colonialism. Ed. Philip Stueward and byron Wells, 231-59. Oxford: Voltaire Foundation 2004.
Katzew, Ilona. Casta Painting: Images of Race in Eighteenth-Century Mexico. New Haven: Yale University Press 2004.
Leibsohn, Dana, and Barbara E. Mundy, "Reckoning with Mestizaje," Vistas: Visual Culture in Spanish America, 1520-1820 (2015). http://www.fordham.edu/vistas.
Lewis, Laura. Hall of Mirrors: Power, Witchcraft, and Caste in Colonial Mexico. Durham: Duke University Press 2003. 
Martinez, Maria Elena. "Interrogating Blood Lines: "Purity of Blood," the Inquisition, and Casta categories." in Religion in New Spain. ed. Susan Schroeder and Stafford Poole, 196-217. Albuquerque: University of New Mexico Press 2007.
Mörner, Magnus. Race Mixture in the History of Latin America. Boston: Little, Brown 1967,
Rappaport, Joanne. The Disappearing Mestizo: Configuring Difference in the Colonial Kingdom of Granada. Durham: Duke University Press 2014. 

Vinson, Ben III. Before Mestizaje: The Frontiers of Race and Caste in Colonial Mexico. New York: Cambridge University Press 2018.

External links

 The 1921 Mexican Census
 The Construction and Function of Race: Creating The Mestizo
 
Copy of the Mestizo Day law - City of Manaus
Copy of the Mestizo Day law - State of Amazon
Copy of the Mestizo Day law - State of Roraima
Copy of the Mestizo Day law - State of Paraíba
Mestizo Nation Movement
Legislative Assembly pays tribute to the caboclos and all Mestizos

 
Spanish words and phrases
Ethnic groups in Argentina
Ethnic groups in Belize
Ethnic groups in Bolivia
Ethnic groups in Chile
Ethnic groups in Colombia
Ethnic groups in Costa Rica
Ethnic groups in Ecuador
Ethnic groups in El Salvador
Ethnic groups in Guatemala
Ethnic groups in Honduras
Ethnic groups in Mexico
Ethnic groups in Nicaragua
Ethnic groups in Panama
Ethnic groups in Paraguay
Ethnic groups in Peru
Ethnic groups in Venezuela
Latin American culture
Latin American caste system
Ethnic groups in Central America
Ethnic groups in the United States
Multiracial affairs in the Americas